The Aquaris E5 and Aquaris E5 FHD are dual-SIM Android smartphones from the Spanish manufacturer BQ that were released to market in July 2014.  The devices shipped with Android 4.4 (KitKat). BQ elected not to skin the operating system and as such it retains the unmodified "Google Experience", such as found on the Google Nexus.

On 9 June 2015 BQ in partnership with Canonical launched the Aquaris E5 HD Ubuntu Edition.  The phone is based on the Aquaris E5 hardware (with the 1280×720 screen) and was sold in the European Union only.

Notably, this is only the third phone to be sold with the Ubuntu Touch mobile operating system, after the BQ Aquaris E4.5 and the Meizu MX4.

See also
 BQ Aquaris E4.5
 Comparison of smartphones

References

External links
 

Android (operating system) devices
Ubuntu Touch devices
Aquaris E5
Mobile phones introduced in 2014
Discontinued smartphones